The 2018 National Premier Leagues was the sixth season of the Australian National Premier Leagues football competition. The league competition was played amongst eight separate divisions, divided by FFA state and territory member federations. The divisions are ACT, NSW, Northern NSW, Queensland, South Australia, Tasmania, Victoria and Western Australia. The winners of each respective divisional league competed in a finals playoff tournament at season end, culminating in a Grand Final.

Campbelltown City were crowned National Premier Leagues Champions and qualified directly for the 2019 FFA Cup Round of 32.

League tables

ACT

Finals

NSW

Finals

Northern NSW

Finals

Queensland

Finals

South Australia

Finals

Tasmania

Victoria

Finals

Western Australia

Finals

Final Series
The winner of each league competition (top of the table) in the NPL will compete in a single match knockout tournament to decide the National Premier Leagues Champion for 2018. The quarter final match-ups were decided by an open draw. Home advantage for the semi-finals and final is based on a formula relating to time of winning (normal time, extra time or penalties), goals scored and allowed, and yellow/red cards. The winner will additionally qualify for the 2019 FFA Cup Round of 32.

Quarter-finals

Semi-finals

Grand Final

References

External links
 Official website

2018
2018 domestic association football leagues
2018 in Australian soccer